Sleeping Luck (in Spanish, La suerte dormida) is a 2003 movie directed by Ángeles González Sinde. The film is based on real facts.

Synopsis
Ángela (Adriana Ozores), a lawyer who has recently lost her family, accepts an indemnity case against a construction company for the death of one of its workers.

Accolades

Goyas 2004 

 Premio Turia al mejor trabajo novel (2003)

See also 
 List of Spanish films of 2003

External links 
 

2003 films
Spanish drama films
2000s Spanish-language films
2003 drama films
Madrid in fiction
Spanish films based on actual events
2000s Spanish films